Later Han (後漢) may refer to two dynastic states in imperial China:

Eastern Han (25–220), the second period of the Han dynasty, also called Later Han
Later Han (947–951), a dynasty during the Five Dynasties and Ten Kingdoms period

See also
Han (disambiguation)